SMS Frundsberg  was an Austro-Hungarian corvette built by Stabilimento Tecnico Triestino.

History
She was laid down on June 19, 1871 and launched on February 11, 1873. It was officially commissioned October 1, 1873 and its last time out was on January 1, 1905. The ship had one smokestack and three square-rigged masts.

References

Bibliography

 

Corvettes of the Austro-Hungarian Navy
Ships built in Trieste
1873 ships